This is a list of Peruvian visual artists:

 Pablo Amaringo (1938–2009)
 Mario Urteaga Alvarado (1875–1957)
 Grimanesa Amorós (born 1962)
 Ana Teresa Barboza (born 1981), textile artist
 Hugo Orellana Bonilla (1932–2007)
 Teófilo Castillo (1857–1922)
 Martín Chambi (1891–1973), photographer
 Gerardo Chavez (born c. 1937)
 Victor Delfín (born c. 1927)
 Andrea Hamilton (born 1968), fine-art photographer
 Daniel Hernández (1856–1932)
 César Yauri Huanay (born 1962)
 Nelson Medina (born 1978)
 Carlos Enrique Polanco
 Irma Poma Canchumani (born 1969), mate burilado artist
 Jorge Vinatea Reinoso (1900–1931)
 José Sabogal (1888–1956)
 Josué Sánchez (born 1945)
 Basilio Santa Cruz Pumacallao (1635–1710)
 Fernando de Szyszlo (1925–2017)
 Antonio Sinchi Roca Inka (17th century)
 Elena Tejada-Herrera
 Diego Quispe Tito (1611–1681)
 Boris Vallejo (born 1941)
 Alberto Vargas (1896–1982)
 Marcos Zapata (c. 1710–1773)

See also 
 List of Latin American artists
 Peruvian art

References
Embassy of Peru, Washington D.C.

 
Artists
Peru